Fortec Motorsport Ltd. is a motor-racing team that races in the GB3 Championship, GB4 Championship and F4 British Championship. The team was bought in 1995 by current owner Richard Dutton.

Past drivers for the team include Juan Pablo Montoya, Gianmaria Bruni, Danny Watts, Jamie Green, James Rossiter, Mike Conway, Fabio Carbone and Heikki Kovalainen.

History

Fortec has enjoyed great success since its inception. In 2002 Danny Watts won the British Formula Renault Championship for the team, with team-mate Jamie Green following close behind in second. In the same year, Fabio Carbone won the prestigious Marlboro Masters Formula Three race, held at Zandvoort in the Netherlands. The team's next championship win came with another British Formula Renault title in 2004, with Mike Conway finishing over 90 points clear of his nearest rival, Comtec Racing's Westley Barber. Fortec added further team championships in the Formula BMW UK championship, taking three successive titles between 2005 and 2007, also taking drivers' championship titles with Niall Breen and Marcus Ericsson.

After a barren year for the team in Formula Renault in 2005, 2006 saw the team regain both championship titles, with Sebastian Hohenthal just clinching the drivers' title on countback, after he and Team A.K.A. driver Patrick Hogan ended the season on the same number of points. Duncan Tappy and Dean Smith finished in the top two placings in 2007. Another teams' title followed in 2008. More recently, the team has seen great improvements in its Formula Renault 3.5 Series results, finishing fifth in the Teams' Championship in 2009, fourth in 2010 and finishing as runners-up in 2011 season with driver Alexander Rossi finishing third overall and best rookie. In 2012 the team fielded rookies Robin Frijns from the Netherlands and Carlos Huertas from Colombia, Frijns won the driver championship in his first year scoring 3 wins during his championship season. Meanwhile, Huertas scored regular results and finished 16th in the season scoring 35 points, but Fortec finished 3rd in the teams championship behind  Tech 1 Racing and New team Arden Caterham  Motorsport.

Fortec were also crowned Team Champions in the Formula Renault 2.0 UK Championship with Alex Lynn clinching the drivers' title with a record-breaking twelve wins in one season. Oliver Rowland secured second in the Championship, as well as winning the Graduate Cup. William Buller was Fortec's top finisher in the British Formula 3 Championship, as he finished fourth in the Championship. In club-level racing, the new-for-2011 InterSteps Championship saw Jake Dennis win the Championship from teammate Alex Walker with Ed Jones finishing in fourth place, while in Formula Renault BARC, Josh Webster narrowly missed out on the drivers', after a close battle with eventual champion Dino Zamparelli.

After the Formula Renault UK was cancelled for the 2012 season, the team joined the Formula Renault 2.0 NEC.

Current series results

BRDC British Formula 3 Championship / GB3 Championship

† Taylor drove for Chris Dittmann Racing from round 7 onwards.

GB4 Championship

F4 British Championship

†Hedley drove for Carlin from round 6 onwards.

Former series results

British Formula 3 International Series

Formula Renault 3.5 Series

Formula V8 3.5 Series

FIA European Formula 3 Championship

Eurocup Formula Renault 2.0

Formula Renault 2.0 Northern European Cup

Euroformula Open Championship

† Includes points scored for other teams

Italian F4 Championship

† Italian F4 Trophy ‡ Shared results with other teams

Timeline

References

External links
 

British auto racing teams
1989 establishments in the United Kingdom
Auto racing teams established in 1989
British Formula Renault teams
World Series Formula V8 3.5 teams
International Formula 3000 teams
Formula BMW teams
Formula Renault Eurocup teams
Formula 3 Euro Series teams
British GT Championship teams
Blancpain Endurance Series teams
FIA Formula 3 European Championship teams
British Formula Three teams
Euroformula Open Championship teams
Italian Formula 3 teams